Lee Sang-ho is a Korean name consisting of the family name Lee and the given name Sang-ho. It may refer to:

 Lee Sang-ho (wrestler) (born 1963), South Korean freestyle wrestler
 Lee Sang-ho (footballer, born 1981), South Korean footballer for Jeju United
 Lee Sang-ho (footballer, born 1987), South Korean footballer for FC Seoul
 Lee Sang-ho (snowboarder) (born 1995), South Korean snowboarder